Rocky Kansas was an Italian-born American tough, short (5'2" tall) former world lightweight champion boxer. He was born Rocco Tozzo on April 21, 1893, in Italy and came to America in 1898. Rocky Kansas was the brother of champion Joe "Kid" Kansas whom he combined with at an attempt to become a champion in 1938.

Background
Rocky was the younger brother of Joe "Kid" Kansas (Tozzo), and older brother of boxer Tony Tozzo.  Kansas and his two brothers combined to defeat 189 opponents in the Buffalo, New York area from 1909-1937. Father to Vincent Tozzo and husband to Jessie Tozzo.

Pro career

Kansas turned pro in 1911 and lost just two official decisions in his first 75 fights. In 1914, he faced his first contender, Johnny Dundee, losing a newspaper decision. Kansas also faced featherweight Champion Johnny Kilbane in a non-title match, but lost the newspaper decision.

During his career Kansas faced the cream of the featherweight and lightweight divisions. On February 28, 1916, Kansas fought the all-time great Benny Leonard. Although, Kansas managed to last the full 10 rounds for a No-Decision, he received a boxing lesson from Leonard.

In 1921 he met Richie Mitchell, a highly regarded Lightweight out of Milwaukee. In the first round Kansas pinned Mitchell against the ropes and knocked him out. Kansas then landed a non-title shot against Benny Leonard, but was again handily out boxed.

Kansas then came up with another upset victory, this time over southpaw Lew Tendler in a close 10-round decision. The victory landed him a title shot at Leonard's lightweight crown. In an exciting fight, Leonard was awarded the unanimous decision.

The two fought yet again. This time Leonard TKOed him in the eleventh round.

Leonard retired and Kansas was given his third title shot at Broadway Auditorium against Jimmy Goodrich, who claimed the title after Leonard's retirement. Kansas was able to get inside on Goodrich and won all but one of the first 13 rounds. Kansas was awarded the 15-round decision, and after over 14 years of professional fighting, Rocky Kansas was finally a champion.

His glory was short lived. On July 3, 1926 he defended against 22-year-old Sammy Mandell. Mandell outboxed Kansas to win the title.

Retirement and death
Kansas retired after the loss. Like many others, he was wiped out in the Stock Market Crash of 1929. Kansas worked for the city of Buffalo in New York State. He had a job there for a few years. Then, in 1952, when he was 56-years old, news then got out about a cancer that he had developed. Kansas died on January 10 or 11th, the exact date is not confirmed, but he died from the 10-16th of January 1954, of cancer, which type or what caused it is still unknown. He was about 60 years old.

Professional boxing record
All information in this section is derived from BoxRec, unless otherwise stated.

Official record

All newspaper decisions are officially regarded as “no decision” bouts and are not counted in the win/loss/draw column.

Unofficial record

Record with the inclusion of newspaper decisions in the win/loss/draw column.

See also
Lineal championship

References

External links
Cyber Boxing Zone page

|-

  

1895 births
1954 deaths
Lightweight boxers
American people of Italian descent
Boxers from New York (state)
Sportspeople from Buffalo, New York
American male boxers
Italian emigrants to the United States